GBA-4 (Nagar-I) is a constituency of Gilgit Baltistan Assembly which is currently represented by the Muhammad Ayub Waziri of ITP.

History 
Before 2015, the constituency was in the Hunza-Nagar District. In 2015, when Nagar was made a separate district, GBA-4 was made its constituency.

Members

Election results

2009
Muhammad Ali Akhtar of Pakistan Peoples Party became member of assembly by getting 3,885 votes.

2015
Doctor Muhammad Ali Haidar of Islami Tehreek Pakistan won by getting 5,039 votes.

2017 

Doctor Muhammad Ali Haidar died of cardiac arrest in February 2017. Javed Hussain of PPP won by securing 6888 votes.

2020 
In the 2020 elections, Amjad Hussain Azar of PPP won 6104 seats and got his seat.

2021 By-Poll Elections 
ITP's Muhammad Ayub Waziri had won by securing 5,422 votes as compared to PTI's Agha Zulfiqar Ali who got 5,085 votes.

References

Gilgit-Baltistan Legislative Assembly constituencies